Berechiu may refer to several villages in Romania:

 Berechiu, a village in Apateu Commune, Arad County
 Berechiu, a village in Sânnicolau Român Commune, Bihor County